the Åland women's official football team represents Åland in women's association football and is controlled by the Åland Football Association (ÅFF). the team isn't affiliated with FIFA  nor UEFA. The team mainly competes in the Island Games. the team was crowned champions winning gold medals three times (2007, 2009 and 2011).

Åland also has a successful women's club football side, Åland United which competes in the Kansallinen Liiga.

Results and fixtures

The following is a list of match results in the last 12 months, as well as any future matches that have been scheduled.

 Legend

2023

Competitive record

Football at the Island Games

Players

Current squad
 The following players were named for the 2017 Islands Games fifth-place match against Menorca on 29 June 2017.

References

External links
Ålands Fotbollförbund 
National-Football-Teams.com
Island Games Website

National football team
European national and official selection-teams not affiliated to FIFA